George Ewing Martin (November 23, 1857 – April 14, 1948) was the chief justice of the United States Court of Appeals for the District of Columbia and previously was an associate judge and later the presiding judge of the United States Court of Customs Appeals.

Education and career

Born in Lancaster, Ohio, Martin attended the University of Heidelberg in the German Empire and received an Artium Baccalaureus degree from Wittenberg College (now Wittenberg University) in 1877. He read law to enter the bar in 1883, and was in private practice in Lancaster from 1883 to 1904. He was a Judge of the Ohio Court of Common Pleas for the 7th Judicial District from 1904 to 1911.

Federal judicial service

Martin was nominated by President William Howard Taft on February 1, 1911, to an Associate Judge seat on the United States Court of Customs Appeals (later the United States Court of Customs and Patent Appeals) vacated by Associate Judge William Henry Hunt. He was confirmed by the United States Senate on February 8, 1911, and received his commission the same day. His service terminated on January 4, 1923, due to his elevation to Presiding Judge of the same court.

Martin was nominated by President Warren G. Harding on December 28, 1922, to the Presiding Judge seat on the United States Court of Customs Appeals (later the United States Court of Customs and Patent Appeals) vacated by Presiding Judge Marion De Vries. He was confirmed by the United States Senate on January 4, 1923, and received his commission the same day. His service terminated on May 24, 1924, due to appointment to the Court of Appeals of the District of Columbia.

Martin was nominated by President Calvin Coolidge on May 16, 1924, to the Chief Justice seat on the Court of Appeals of the District of Columbia (United States Court of Appeals for the District of Columbia from June 7, 1934, now the United States Court of Appeals for the District of Columbia Circuit) vacated by Chief Justice Constantine Joseph Smyth. He was confirmed by the United States Senate on May 22, 1924, and received his commission the same day. He assumed senior status on September 30, 1937. His service terminated on April 14, 1948, due to his death in Washington, D.C.

References

Sources
 

1857 births
1948 deaths
People from Lancaster, Ohio
Ohio state court judges
Judges of the United States Court of Appeals for the D.C. Circuit
Judges of the United States Court of Customs and Patent Appeals
United States Article I federal judges appointed by William Howard Taft
United States Article I federal judges appointed by Warren G. Harding
United States court of appeals judges appointed by Calvin Coolidge
20th-century American judges
Wittenberg University alumni
United States federal judges admitted to the practice of law by reading law